Tarryn Allarakhia (born 17 October 1997) is an English footballer who plays as a midfielder or a winger for Wealdstone.

Allarakhia's early career began at Leyton Orient, before continuing his development at Aveley. He joined Maldon & Tiptree in January 2016, before signing a development contract with Colchester United in July 2017. He was released after one year at Colchester and joined fellow League Two club Crawley Town. In August 2021, he joined Woking.
In June 2022, he joined Wealdstone.

Career
Born in Redbridge, London, Allarakhia is a former player in Leyton Orient's Academy. He trained with Bournemouth during the summer of 2015 and also had a one week trial at Norwich City. He was signed to Aveley's first-team from their youth system in 2015 where he played as a winger. He made eight league appearances for Aveley between October and December and scored one goal, and also made one appearance in the Essex Senior Cup.

In January 2016, Allarakhia became Steve Ball's first signing as manager of Maldon & Tiptree. He scored one goal in 18 appearances during the second-half of the 2015–16 season, and scored a further four goals in 37 appearances during his first full season with the Jammers. During his first few months at the club, through Maldon & Tiptree's link-up with Colchester United, Allarakhia made appearances for the Colchester under-21 team.

In July 2017, Allarakhia signed a one year development contract with Colchester United. He was released by the club at the end of the season.

On 1 August 2018, Crawley Town signed Allarakhia on a two-year contract. He made his professional debut on 14 August in Crawley's EFL Cup match against Bristol Rovers. Allarakhia was loaned out for 28 days to Wealdstone on 8 January 2019. The deal was later extended to the end of the season. He made 18 appearances, scoring 4 times as Wealdstone reached the semi-finals of the playoffs. He was released by Crawley Town in summer 2021.

On 19 August 2021, Allarakhia joined National League side, Woking on a one-year deal following a short-term trial period. He went onto feature twenty-two times for The Cards before leaving in July 2022 at the end of his contract.

On 27 June 2022, Allarakhia rejoined Wealdstone following his departure from Woking. Allarakhia scored his first goal back at the club on 16 August 2022, scoring the second goal in a 2-1 win away at Oldham Athletic.

Career statistics

References

1997 births
Living people
Footballers from the London Borough of Redbridge
English footballers
Association football midfielders
Association football wingers
Association football forwards
Aveley F.C. players
Maldon & Tiptree F.C. players
Colchester United F.C. players
Crawley Town F.C. players
Wealdstone F.C. players
Woking F.C. players
Isthmian League players
English Football League players